Hasell Point, an “address restricted” landmark in Beaufort County, South Carolina, with its mix of burial mounds, potter and an oyster shell midden, is a potentially important archaeological site, one that may yield significant information dating to 500 AD. Hasell Point was listed in the National Register of Historic Places on August 14, 1973.

References

Archaeological sites on the National Register of Historic Places in South Carolina
Geography of Beaufort County, South Carolina
National Register of Historic Places in Beaufort County, South Carolina